Hello Bastards is the second full-length album by the punk rock band Lifetime. It was recorded at Trax East Studio in New Jersey, USA, during May and June 1995 and was released by Jade Tree Records on September 25, 1995. On February 20, 2010, No Idea Records re-released the album on 12" color vinyl.

Musical style
The album has been described musically as punk rock, melodic hardcore, hardcore punk, emo, and pop-punk.

Critical reception

Journalists Leslie Simon and Trevor Kelley included the album in their list of the most essential emo releases in their book Everybody Hurts: An Essential Guide to Emo Culture (2007). "(The Gym Is) Neutral Territory" appeared at number 52 on a best-of emo songs list by Vulture.

Track listing
"Daneurysm" – 1:12
"Rodeo Clown" – 2:03
"Anchor" – 2:23
"I'm Not Calling You" – 2:31
"Bobby Truck Tricks" – 2:26
"(The Gym Is) Neutral Territory" – 2:20
"I Like You OK" – 0:49
"It's Not Funny Anymore" (Hüsker Dü cover) – 2:03
"Irony Is for Suckers" – 1:44
"What She Said" – 1:04
"Knives, Bats, New Tats" – 1:57
"Ostrichsized" – 2:25

Limited colored vinyl editions

Jade Tree Records
 550 copies on white vinyl
 500 copies on purple vinyl

No Idea Records

February 20, 2010
 500 mysterious int
 500 gruesome green
 500 blank stare white

Personnel

Lifetime
 Bo Bo Han – lead bastard
 Ari Katz – vocals
 Dan Yemin – guitar
 Pete Martin – guitar
 Dave Palaitis – bass guitar
 Scott Golley – drums

Production
 Steve Evetts – production, engineering, mixing
 Michael Sarsfield – mastering
 John Yates – graphics
 Tim Owen – photography

References
Citations

Sources

External links

Hello Bastards at YouTube (streamed copy where licensed)

1995 albums
Lifetime (band) albums
Jade Tree (record label) albums
Albums produced by Steve Evetts